Little Gransden Airfield  is an unlicensed airfield located near the village of Little Gransden,  southeast of St Neots, Cambridgeshire, England.

Little Gransden Airfield is located in the grounds of Fuller's Hill Farm. It is also the home of Yak UK Ltd., who import, service and sell the Yakovlev range of piston engined aerobatic aircraft.

Location
Pilots climbing out on runway 28 will be able to see the disused runways of RAF Tempsford on the left side just before the railway.  RAF Tempsford was a secret airfield operated by the Special Operations Executive during World War II.  Nearby are other former RAF airfields: Gransden Lodge Airfield, now home to the Cambridge Gliding Club; and Bourn.

Events
Each summer the airfield is home to Little Gransden Families Day Out Air & Vintage Vehicle Show which raises money for the Children in Need charity. The 2012 show, the 20th annual event, took place on 26 August, raising over £26000. In 2013, the show will be held on 25 August.

Planning controversy
In 1992 South Cambridgeshire District Council served a planning contravention notice on the airfield, which had been operating since 1966.  The council was supported by a local pressure group Cambridgeshire Airfields Action Group (CAAG).  In 1995 the council served a planning enforcement notice. The airfield, supported by planning consultant Peter Kember and some of some local villagers, argued at a public enquiry that they were operating lawfully based on 10 years' continuous use.
The airfield's planning appeal succeeded in 1999 and the airfield was allowed to continue operating. Furthermore, in 2002 Peter Kember succeeded in challenging South Cambridgeshire District Council's Small Airfields Policy which attempted to put further restrictions on Little Gransden and other airfields in the area.

See also
United Kingdom AIP
List of airports in the United Kingdom
 Cambridge Bomber and Fighter Society

References

External links

 Airfield information
 Yak UK
 Little Gransden Families Day Out Air & Vintage Vehicle Show
 Air Displays by Mark Jefferies
 Cambridge Gliding Club (at nearby Gransden Lodge)

Airports in England
Transport in Cambridgeshire
Airports in the East of England